The 2001 USL A-League was an American Division II league run by the United Soccer Leagues during the summer of 2001.

History
The addition of the Portland Timbers this season saw the renewal of a Pacific Northwest rivalry between them, the Seattle Sounders and Vancouver Whitecaps which dated back to the North American Soccer League.  Although Vancouver was not new to the league, this was the first season they competed in under the Whitecaps name.  Beginning with their founding in 1986 through the 2000 A-League season, Vancouver had operated under the 86ers name.  An ownership change in August 2000 brought a revival of the old Whitecaps name for the 2001 season.  At the end of the regular season, the Richmond Kickers topped the league with seventy-six points.  The post-season was marred by two tragedies.  First, the September 11 attacks forced the league to reschedule the first-round games which had been set to begin on September 12.  Then, Mickey Trotman, a starter for the Rochester Rhinos, was killed in an automobile accident two days before the team's first semifinal match with the Milwaukee Rampage.  In the end, the Rhinos overcame the Hershey Wildcats to take its third league title in four seasons.

League standings

Northern Conference

Central Conference

Western Conference

Playoffs

Bracket

First round

Pittsburgh vs Charleston

San Diego vs Atlanta

Portland vs Charlotte

Milwaukee vs Nashville

Quarterfinals

Milwaukee vs Richmond

Hershey vs Portland

Vancouver vs San Diego

Rochester vs Pittsburgh

Semifinals

Semifinal 1

Semifinal 2

Final

Points leaders

Honors

Annual awards
 Most Valuable Player:  Paul Conway
 Leading Goal Scorer: Paul Conway
 Goalkeeper of the Year:  Jon Busch
 Defender of the Year:  Rick Titus
 Rookie of the Year:  Robbie Aristodemo
 Coach of the Year: Dale Mitchell
 First Team All A-League
Goalkeeper: Jon Busch
Defenders: Scott Schweitzer, Rick Titus, Gilbert Jean-Baptiste
Midfielders: Philippe Godoy, Stoian Mladenov, Leighton O'Brien, Temoc Suarez
Forwards: Paul Conway, Kevin Jeffrey, Dustin Swinehart
 Second Team All A-League
Goalkeeper: Matt Napoleon
Defenders: James Wall, Brent Sancho, Jason Annicchero
Midfielders: John Ball, Lenin Steenkamp, Kevin Knight, Steve Kindel
Forwards: Jakob Fenger, Digital Takawira, Rodrigo Costa

External links
 2001 A-League
 2001 A-League season

References

2
2001 in Canadian soccer
2001
Association football events curtailed due to the September 11 attacks